Francisco de Cosío y Otero (1640–1715) was a Roman Catholic prelate who served as Archbishop of Santafé en Nueva Granada (1704–1715).

Biography
Francisco de Cosío y Otero was born in Turieno, Spain on 12 Apr 1640.
On 14 Jan 1704, he was appointed during the papacy of Pope Clement XI as Archbishop of Santafé en Nueva Granada.
On 6 Apr 1704, he was consecrated bishop by Pedro Portocarrero y Guzmán, Patriarch of West Indies, with Benito Madueño y Ramos, Titular Bishop of Sion and Atanasio Esterriga Trajanáuregui, Titular Bishop of Lycopolis, serving as co-consecrators. 
He served as Archbishop of Santafé en Nueva Granada until his death on 29 Nov 1715.

While bishop, he was the principal co-consecrator of Jerónimo Nosti de Valdés, Bishop of Puerto Rico (1704).

References

External links and additional sources
 (for Chronology of Bishops) 
 (for Chronology of Bishops) 

18th-century Roman Catholic bishops in Spain
Bishops appointed by Pope Clement XI
1640 births
1715 deaths
Roman Catholic archbishops of Bogotá